2013 Regional League Division 2 Bangkok Metropolitan Region is the 5th season of the League competition since its establishment in 2009. It is in the third tier of the Thai football league system.

Changes from Last Season

Team Changes

Promoted Clubs

Rayong United were promoted to the 2013 Thai Division 1 League.

Relocated Clubs

Paknampho NSRU re-located to the Regional League Bangkok Area Division from the Regional League Northern Division 2012.

Thai Airways-Look Isan moved into the Central-East Division 2013.

Globlex, Krung Thonburi, Samut Sakhon, Thonburi BG United have all been moved into the Central-West Division 2013.

Withdrawn Clubs

Central Lions have withdrawn from the 2013 campaign.

Expansion Clubs
Laem Chabang joined the newly expanded league setup.

Stadium and locations

League table

References

External links
  Thai Division 2 League Bangkok & field Region

Regional League Bangkok Area Division seasons
Bang